Karsten Koch (born 22 February 1977) is a German professional darts player he currently playing in Professional Darts Corporation (PDC) events.

Koch first qualified for a PDC European Tour event in 2019, when he qualified for the 2019 German Darts Open, but he lost to Vincent van der Meer 6-4 in the first round. He also qualified for the 2019 European Darts Matchplay, and beat Maik Kuivenhoven in his opener but then lost to Ricky Evans in the second round.

References

External links

Living people
German darts players
Professional Darts Corporation associate players
1977 births
People from Viersen
Sportspeople from Düsseldorf (region)